Bartholomäus Brötzner (born 20 February 1957) is an Austrian wrestler. He competed in the men's freestyle 74 kg at the 1980 Summer Olympics.

References

1957 births
Living people
Austrian male sport wrestlers
Olympic wrestlers of Austria
Wrestlers at the 1980 Summer Olympics
People from Salzburg-Umgebung District
Sportspeople from Salzburg (state)